The Seveso is a  Italian river that flows through the provinces of Como, Monza e Brianza and Milan. It rises  on Sasso di Cavallasca or  Monte Sasso of  Cavallasca,  near  San Fermo della Battaglia. From here its course runs through the communes  Montano Lucino, Grandate, Civello, Casnate con Bernate, Portichetto, Fino Mornasco, Cucciago, Vertemate con Minoprio, Asnago, Carimate, Cimnago, Lentate sul Seveso, Camnago, Barlassina, Seveso, Cesano Maderno, Binzago, Bovisio-Masciago, Varedo, Palazzolo Milanese, Paderno Dugnano, Cusano Milanino, Cormano, Bresso. Finally, at Milan, it joins with the canal called the Naviglio Martesana which flows into the Lambro.

The Seveso is sometimes called il fiume nero, or “the black river” on account of the colour it acquires from industrial pollutants.

The 'Oltreseveso' is the area in the north-west of Lombardy, (it is ‘oltre’ (beyond) the Seveso river). The beyond Seveso brianzolo, ( of Brianza), consists of the municipalities of Cermenate, Lazzate, Misinto, Cogliate, Ceriano Laghetto, Solaro and Limbiate.

Rivers of Italy
Rivers of the Province of Como
Rivers of the Province of Monza and Brianza
Rivers of the Province of Milan